Somalia League is the top division of the Somali Football. The competitions was created in 1960. 8 teams contested the league in 2013–2014.

Teams

League table

References

External links
Soccerway
Somalia Football Association

Football leagues in Somalia